The Dayton Bulldogs was an indoor football team in Dayton, Ohio.  They were members of the National Indoor Football League that played during the 2006 season.  They played their home games at the Nutter Center.

History 
The Dayton Bulldogs were founded in 2006 following the folding of the Dayton Warbirds.  The Warbirds tried to enter the United Indoor Football league, but were expelled from that league due to financial issues.  The franchise rejoined the NIFL under new owners Bishop Keith Brooks and Denise Jackson just before the start of the season.  They hired head coach Derrick Davidson and his assistant Ramone Davenport.

In the middle of the season, the Nutter Center evicted the franchise due to unpaid bills.  The team then announced that they had secured a small indoor soccer venue, but this was untrue and all remaining home games became forfeit losses.  At about the same time, the team disintegrated, to be replaced by a road team.  The real Bulldogs only played five or six games, only defeating Cincinnati and Tennessee.  The other victory was a forfeit win over the Twin City Gators.  On the positive side, the team was competitive in their early games against the rival Cincinnati Marshals.  After losing 62-28, the Bulldogs came back the next weekend with a blowout 52-34 win of their own.  The franchise would fold themselves after the season.

References

National Indoor Football League teams
American football teams in Dayton, Ohio
2006 establishments in Ohio
2006 disestablishments in Ohio
American football teams established in 2006
American football teams disestablished in 2006